The Puerto Rico women's national water polo team is the representative for Puerto Rico in international women's water polo.

History

Recent History
Puerto Rico qualified for the 2019 Pan American Games on the back of a second place finish at the 2018 Central American and Caribbean Games which was held in Barranquilla, Colombia. After losing their opening game of the tournament against the United States, they recorded a win over Venezuela 9-5.

Results

World Championship
2007 — 16th place

Pan American Games

1999 — 5th place
2003 — 5th place
2007 — 5th place
2011 — 5th place
2015 — 5th place
2019 — 5th place

References

Water polo
Women's national water polo teams
National water polo teams in North America
National water polo teams by country